Upper-atmospheric lightning and ionospheric lightning are terms sometimes used by researchers to refer to a family of short-lived electrical-breakdown phenomena that occur well above the altitudes of normal lightning and storm clouds. Upper-atmospheric lightning is believed to be electrically induced forms of luminous plasma. The preferred usage is transient luminous event (TLE), because the various types of electrical-discharge phenomena in the upper atmosphere lack several characteristics of the more familiar tropospheric lightning.

Transient luminous events have also been observed in far-ultraviolet images of Jupiter's upper atmosphere, high above the altitude of lightning-producing water clouds.

Characteristics
There are several types of TLEs, the most common being sprites. Sprites are flashes of bright red light that occur above storm systems. C-sprites (short for “columniform sprites”) is the name given to vertical columns of red light. C-sprites exhibiting tendrils are sometimes called “carrot sprites”. Other types of TLEs include sprite halos, ghosts, blue jets, gigantic jets, pixies, gnomes, trolls, blue starters, and ELVESs. The acronym ELVES (“Emission of Light and Very Low Frequency perturbations due to Electromagnetic Pulse Sources”) refers to a singular event which is commonly thought of as being plural. TLEs are secondary phenomena that occur in the upper atmosphere in association with underlying thunderstorm lightning.

TLEs generally last anywhere from less than a millisecond to more than 2 seconds. The first video recording of a TLE was captured accidentally on July 6, 1989 when researcher R.C Franz left a camera running overnight to view the night sky. When reviewing the video taken, two finger-like vertical images appeared in two frames of the film. The next known video recordings of a TLE were taken in 1989, when the Shuttle Mission STS-34 was conducting the Mesoscale Lightning Observation Experiment. On October 21, 1989 TLEs were recorded during orbits 44 and 45.

TLEs have been captured by a variety of optical recording systems, with the total number of recent recorded events (early 2009) estimated at many tens-of-thousands. The global rate of TLE occurrence has been estimated from satellite (FORMOSAT-2) observations to be several million events per year.

History
In the 1920s, the Scottish physicist C.T.R. Wilson predicted that electrical breakdown should occur in the atmosphere high above large thunderstorms. In ensuing decades, high altitude electrical discharges were reported by aircraft pilots and discounted by meteorologists until the first direct visual evidence was documented in 1989. Several years later, the optical signatures of these events were named 'sprites' by researchers to avoid inadvertently implying physical properties that were, at the time, still unknown. The terms red sprites and blue jets gained popularity after a video clip was circulated following an aircraft research campaign to study sprites in 1994.

Sprites

Sprites are large-scale electrical discharges which occur high above a thunderstorm cloud, or cumulonimbus, giving rise to a quite varied range of visual shapes. They are triggered by the discharges of positive lightning between the thundercloud and the ground. The phenomena were named after the mischievous sprite, e.g., Shakespeare's Ariel or Puck, and is also a bacronym for Stratospheric/mesospheric Perturbations Resulting from Intense Thunderstorm Electrification. They normally are colored reddish-orange or greenish-blue, with hanging tendrils below and arcing branches above. They can also be preceded by a reddish halo, known as a sprite halo. Sprites have been witnessed thousands of times. Sprites have been held responsible for otherwise unexplained accidents involving high altitude vehicular operations above thunderstorms.

Jets
Although jets are considered to be a type of upper-atmospheric lightning, it has been found that they are components of tropospheric lightning and a type of cloud-to-air discharge that initiates within a thunderstorm and travels upwards. In contrast, other types of TLEs are not electrically connected with tropospheric lightning—despite being triggered by it. The two main types of jets are blue jets and gigantic jets. Blue starters are considered to be a weaker form of blue jets.

Blue jets

Blue jets are believed to be initiated as "normal" lightning discharges between the upper positive charge region in a thundercloud and a negative "screening layer" present above this charge region. The positive end of the leader network fills the negative charge region before the negative end fills the positive charge region, and the positive leader subsequently exits the cloud and propagates upward. It was previously believed that blue jets were not directly related to lightning flashes, and that the presence of hail somehow led to their occurrence. They are also brighter than sprites and, as implied by their name, are blue in color. The color is believed to be due to a set of blue and near-ultraviolet emission lines from neutral and ionized molecular nitrogen. They were first recorded on October 21, 1989, on a monochrome video of a thunderstorm on the horizon taken from the Space Shuttle as it passed over Australia. Blue jets occur much less frequently than sprites. By 2007, fewer than a hundred images had been obtained. The majority of these images, which include the first color imagery, are associated with a single thunderstorm. These were taken in a series of 1994 aircraft flights to study sprites.  More recently, the source and formation of blue jets has been observed from the International Space Station.

Blue starters
Blue starters were discovered on video from a night time research flight around thunderstorms and appear to be "an upward moving luminous phenomenon closely related to blue jets." They appear to be shorter and brighter than blue jets, reaching altitudes of only up to 20 km. "Blue starters appear to be blue jets that never quite make it," according to Dr. Victor P. Pasko, associate professor of electrical engineering.

Gigantic jets
Where blue jets are believed to initiate between the upper positive charge region and a negative screening layer directly above this region, gigantic jets appear to initiate as an intracloud flash between the middle negative and upper positive charge regions in the thundercloud. The negatively charged leader then escapes upward from the cloud toward the ionosphere before it can discharge within the cloud. Gigantic jets reach higher altitudes than blue jets, terminating at 90km. While they may appear to be visually similar to carrot-type sprites, gigantic jets differ in that they are not associated with cloud to ground lightning and propagate upward from the cloud at a slower rate.

Observations
On September 14, 2001, scientists at the Arecibo Observatory photographed a gigantic jet—double the height of those previously observed—reaching around  into the atmosphere. The jet was located above a thunderstorm over an ocean, and lasted under a second.

The jets lasted under a second, with shapes likened by the researchers to giant trees and carrots.

On November 10, 2012, the Chinese Science Bulletin reported a gigantic jet event observed over a thunderstorm in mainland China on August 12, 2010. "GJ event that was clearly recorded in eastern China (storm center located at 35.6°N,119.8°E, near the Huanghai Sea)".

On February 2, 2014, the Oro Verde Observatory of Argentina reported ten or more gigantic jet events observed over a thunderstorm in Entre Ríos south. The storm center was located at 33°S, 60°W, near the city of Rosario.

On August 13, 2016, photographer Phebe Pan caught a clear wide-angle photo of a gigantic jet on a wide-angle lens while shooting Perseid meteors atop Shi Keng Kong peak in Guangdong province and Li Hualong captured the same jet from a more distant location in Jiahe, Hunan, China.

On March 28, 2017, photographer Jeff Miles captured four gigantic jets over Australia.

On July 24, 2017, the Gemini Cloudcam at the Mauna Kea Observatory in Hawaii captured several gigantic jets as well as ionosphere-height gravity waves during one thunderstorm.

On October 16, 2019, pilot Chris Holmes captured a high-resolution video of a gigantic jet from 35,000 feet (10.6 km) above the Gulf of Mexico near the Yucatán Peninsula. From 35 miles (56 km), Holmes's video shows a blue streamer reach up from the top of a thunderstorm to the ionosphere, becoming red at the top. Only then does a brilliant white lightning leader crawl slowly from the top of the cloud, reaching about 10% of the height of the gigantic jet before fading.

On September 20, 2021, at 10:41 pm (02:41 UTC) facing NE from Cabo Rojo, Puerto Rico, photographer Frankie Lucena recorded a video of a gigantic jet plasma event which occurred over a thunderstorm in the area.

On June 13, 2022, northern Kansas, US, photographer Paul M Smith captured several gigantic jet events over a thunderstorm. The farthest north they have been recorded.

Other types

Elves 
Their color was unknown for some time, but is now believed to be red. ELVES were first recorded on another shuttle mission, this time recorded off French Guiana on October 7, 1990. That ELVES was discovered in the Shuttle Video by the Mesoscale Lightning Experiment (MLE) team at Marshall Space Flight Center, AL led by the Principal Investigator, Otha H."Skeet" Vaughan, Jr.

ELVES is a whimsical acronym for Emissions of Light and Very Low Frequency Perturbations due to Electromagnetic Pulse Sources. This refers to the process by which the light is generated; the excitation of nitrogen molecules due to electron collisions (the electrons possibly having been energized by the electromagnetic pulse caused by a discharge from an underlying thunderstorm).

Trolls 
TROLLs (Transient Red Optical Luminous Lineaments) occur after strong sprites, and appear as red spots with faint tails, and on higher-speed cameras, appear as a rapid series of events, starting as a red glow that forms after a sprite tendril, that later produces a red streak downward from itself. They are similar to jets.

Pixies 
Pixies were first observed during the STEPS program during the summer of 2000, a multi-organizational field program investigating the electrical characteristics over thunderstorms on the High Plains. A series of unusual, white luminous events atop the thunderstorm were observed over a 20-minute period, lasting for an average of 16 milliseconds each. They were later dubbed 'pixies'. These pixies are less than 100 meters across, and are not related to lightning.

Ghosts 
Ghosts (Green emissions from excited Oxygen in Sprite Tops) are faint, green glows that appear within the footprint of a red sprite, remaining after the red has dissipated, and fading away in milliseconds. Though possible examples of Ghosts can be seen in historical images, Ghosts were first noted as an exclusive phenomenon by storm chasers Hank Schyma and Paul M Smith in 2019.

No scientific journal papers have been published on these phenomena, but their green glow has been speculated by observers to come from excited oxygen atoms, much as how auroras appear green.

Gnomes 
A Gnome is a type of lightning that is a small, brief spike of light that points upward from a thunderstorm cloud's anvil top, caused as strong updrafts push moist air above the anvil. It lasts for only a few microseconds. It is about 200 meters wide, and is a maximum of 1 kilometer in height. Its color is unknown as it has only been observed in black-and-white footage. Most sources unofficially refer to them as "Gnomes".

See also

 Aurora
 Heat lightning
 Schumann resonances
 Sprite (lightning)
 St. Elmo's fire
 Steve (atmospheric phenomenon)

References

External links

 Homepage of the Eurosprite campaign, itself part of the CAL (Coupled Atmospheric Layers) research group
 March 2, 1999, University of Houston: UH Physicists Pursue Lightning-Like Mysteries Quote: "...Red sprites and blue jets are brief but powerful lightning-like flashes that appear at altitudes of 40–100 km (25–60 miles) above thunderstorms..."
 Ground and Balloon-Borne Observations of Sprites and Jets
 Barrington-Leigh, C. P., "ELVES : Ionospheric Heating By the Electromagnetic Pulses from Lightning (A primer)". Space Science Lab, Berkeley.
 "Darwin Sprites '97". Space Physics Group, University of Otago.
 Gibbs, W. Wayt, "Sprites and ELVES : Lightning's strange cousins flicker faster than light itself". San Francisco. ScientificAmerican.com.
 Barrington-Leigh, Christopher, "VLF Research at Palmer Station".
 Sprites, jets and TLE pictures and articles
 High speed video (10,000 frame/s) taken by Hans Stenbaek-Nielsen, University of Alaska
 Video Reveals 'Sprite' Lightning Secrets, Livescience article, 2007.
 Video evidence
  Pictures and video of two separate gigantic jets above Oklahoma
 Gigantic jets between a thundercloud and the ionosphere.
 Huge Mystery Flashes Seen In Outer Atmosphere
 Sprite Gallery
 http://webarchive.loc.gov/all/20020914103454/http://elf.gi.alaska.edu/
 The Endless, Short film inspired by Sprite
 Cloud Flashes | ZT Research

Electrical phenomena
Lightning
Space plasmas
Weather hazards
Light sources